Lucas Matías Oviedo (born 19 April 1985) is an Argentine football midfielder who plays for Sarmiento Resistencia.

Career

Oviedo began his playing career with San Martín de Tucumán in the regionalised 4th division of Argentine football in 2002. He won several promotions with the club, eventually helping the side to win the 2nd division championship and gain automatic promotion to the Primera División at the end of the 2007-08 season.

Following this success Oviedo was signed by Primera División side Club Atlético Tigre in 2008. Two years later, he returned to San Martín.

Honours

External links
 
 BDFA profile 
  
 

1985 births
Living people
Sportspeople from Tucumán Province
Argentine footballers
Association football midfielders
Argentine Primera División players
Primera Nacional players
Torneo Federal A players
San Martín de Tucumán footballers
Club Atlético Tigre footballers
San Martín de San Juan footballers
Club Atlético Sarmiento footballers
Boca Unidos footballers
Club Atlético Brown footballers
Crucero del Norte footballers
Estudiantes de Río Cuarto footballers
Sarmiento de Resistencia footballers